Crossmyloof railway station is a railway station serving the area of Crossmyloof in Glasgow, Scotland, located  from Glasgow Central. The station is managed by ScotRail and is served by trains on the Glasgow South Western Line.

The overline station building was removed during the late 1990s. The overbridge (Titwood Road) was rebuilt during 2006.

On 6 October 2012, a Highland cow escaped the nearby Pollok Country Park and walked the rail line to this station, where it was captured and returned.

Services
Evening service is generally hourly to East Kilbride and Kilmarnock and 2 trains per hour to Glasgow Central. 

Sundays see a half-hourly service to East Kilbride and Glasgow Central but there is no service to Barrhead or Kilmarnock.
Passengers can change at Pollokshaws West for services towards Kilmarnock and stations to Carlisle

References

Sources

Railway stations in Glasgow
Former Glasgow, Barrhead and Kilmarnock Joint Railway stations
Railway stations in Great Britain opened in 1888
SPT railway stations
Railway stations served by ScotRail